Pea Ridge is a census-designated place (CDP) in Cabell County, West Virginia, United States.  As of the 2010 census, the population was 6,650.

Pea Ridge is part of the Huntington-Ashland, WV-KY-OH, Metropolitan Statistical Area (MSA). As of the 2010 census, the MSA had a population of 287,702. New definitions from February 28, 2013 placed the population at 363,000.

Geography
Pea Ridge is located at  (38.415668, -82.321367). It is a suburban community to nearby Huntington, West Virginia. It is centered on Pea Ridge Road, running from Barboursville to Altizer, a neighborhood in Huntington. Pea Ridge Road is divided into east and west sections, separated by a short section of Route 60.

According to the United States Census Bureau, the CDP has a total area of 2.3 square miles (6.1 km2), of which 2.3 square miles (5.9 km2)  is land and 0.1 square mile  (0.1 km2)  (2.41%) is water.

Demographics
As of the census of 2000, there were 6,363 people, 2,814 households, and 1,820 families residing in the CDP. The population density was 2,756.2 people per square mile (1,063.5/km2). There were 3,046 housing units at an average density of 1,319.4/sq mi (509.1/km2). The racial makeup of the CDP was 94.58% White, 1.62% African American, 0.24% Native American, 2.58% Asian, 0.02% Pacific Islander, 0.06% from other races, and 0.91% from two or more races. Hispanic or Latino of any race were 0.42% of the population.

There were 2,814 households, out of which 23.4% had children under the age of 18 living with them, 54.9% were married couples living together, 8.2% had a female householder with no husband present, and 35.3% were non-families. 30.0% of all households were made up of individuals, and 11.1% had someone living alone who was 65 years of age or older. The average household size was 2.25 and the average family size was 2.80.

In the CDP the population was spread out, with 19.4% under the age of 18, 9.1% from 18 to 24, 28.5% from 25 to 44, 25.2% from 45 to 64, and 17.8% who were 65 years of age or older. The median age was 41 years. For every 100 females, there were 89.6 males. For every 100 females age 18 and over, there were 86.5 males.

The median income for a household in the CDP was $41,739, and the median income for a family was $55,294. Males had a median income of $41,192 versus $26,090 for females. The per capita income for the CDP was $23,904. About 3.8% of families and 6.2% of the population were below the poverty line, including 5.2% of those under age 18 and 3.5% of those age 65 or over.

References

Census-designated places in Cabell County, West Virginia
Populated places on the Guyandotte River